Visa requirements for Bangladeshi citizens are administrative entry restrictions imposed on citizens of Bangladesh by the authorities of other countries.  Bangladeshi citizens who hold regular or ordinary Bangladeshi passports have visa free or visa on arrival access to 49 countries and territories, ranking the Bangladeshi passport 93rd in terms of travel freedom according to the Global Passport Index. Bangladeshi citizens who hold Diplomatic passports and/or Official passports of Bangladesh have visa free or visa on arrival access to many more countries.


Visa requirements map

Visa requirements

Non-visa restrictions

See also

 Visa policy of Bangladesh
 List of nationalities forbidden at border

References and notes
References

Notes

Bangladesh
Foreign relations of Bangladesh